The 1947 Grambling Tigers football team represented Grambling College (now known as Grambling State University) as an independent during the 1947 college football season. In their fifth season under head coach Eddie Robinson, the Tigers compiled an 11–2 record and outscored opponents by a total of 427 to 86. In two post-season game, the Tigers defeated Bethune-Cookman in the Lions Bowl and lost to Central State in the Vulcan Bowl.

Key players included back Paul "Tank" Younger. Younger became the first player from a historically black college to play in the National Football League (NFL). He played 10 years in the NFL and was later inducted into the College Football Hall of Fame.

Schedule

References

Grambling
Grambling State Tigers football seasons
Grambling Tigers football